Scabiosa stellata is a species of flowering plant in the honeysuckle family, Caprifoliaceae. It is known by the common name starflower pincushions or starflower scabious. It was formerly placed in the teasel family. It is native to southwestern Europe and North Africa, and it is known widely as an ornamental plant. This erect annual plant has an inflorescence which is a dense spherical cluster of flowers. They yield showy fruits with fan-like funnel-shaped papery bracts.

References

External links
Jepson Manual Treatment

stellata
Plants described in 1753
Taxa named by Carl Linnaeus